Egan is an unincorporated community in Johnson County, Texas, United States.

Egan is part of the Joshua Independent School District.

History
The area was first settled during the Civil War by M.J., J.P., and W.E. Miller. The site was surveyed in 1883 by the Missouri, Kansas and Texas Railroad after it extended its tracks through the area- a surveyor would give Egan its name. The same year, a post office was established and by 1885, the town had 50 residents, a store, school, and two churches. A winery was established in the twentieth-century but closed during Prohibition. The post office closed in 1930 and the population would decline from its peak of 115 in the mid-1920s to around 21 in 2000. The town was heavily damaged by an EF2 tornado on April 4, 2022. One person was injured by tornado.

References

Unincorporated communities in Johnson County, Texas
Unincorporated communities in Texas
Dallas–Fort Worth metroplex